Selevasio Tolofua (born 31 May 1997) is a French rugby union player. His position is in the back row and he currently plays for Toulouse in the Top 14.

Personal life
Tolofua comes from a family of four boys, he is the younger brother of Christopher Tolofua, who also started his career with Stade Toulousain. He is of Wallisian heritage.

References

External links
Toulouse profile
L'Équipe profile

1997 births
Living people
French rugby union players
Stade Toulousain players
Rugby union number eights
French people of Wallis and Futuna descent
Rugby union players from Wallis and Futuna
France international rugby union players
Sportspeople from Lille